Korun "Koča" Anđelković (1755 – 7 September 1788), known as Captain Koča (Kapetan Koča), was a Serbian leader of the Serbian Free Corps, the Habsburg military unit that fought the Ottomans during the Austro-Turkish War (1787–91).

Life
Korun Anđelković was born around 1755 in the Moravian village of Panjevac (today Kočino Selo), where his father, Anđelko Petrović, moved after fleeing Albanian tyranny in the Pashalik of Scutari.

At that time, Serbian volunteer detachments were being formed in Austria, the Serbian Free Corps was under the command of Major Mihaljević. Before the beginning of the war, Koča and his brother Petar joined the volunteers in the company of Radič Petrović, the three men took part in both Austrian expeditions against Belgrade in 1787 and 1788.

In 1788 an uprising was organised in the Sanjak of Smederevo by the Serbs, Kara-George (Karađorđe) was one of them and Captain Koča led the group, the liberated territory became known as Kočina Krajina (Koča's country). The area became part of Habsburg-occupied Serbia (1788–92).

Koča led more raids in Pomoravlje, and it is known to have carried out three major ambushes on Turkish detachments. For his service, he received the rank of captain from Austrian Emperor Joseph II and was awarded a gold medal for bravery.

Koča was captured by the Turks near Brzaska on 7 September 1788, he was taken to Tekija and tortured along with 30 of his men, he was then executed through public impalement.

Legacy
The village where he was born, Panjevac, was renamed Kočino Selo in 1930 in his honor.

References

Further reading
 
 
 

18th-century Serbian people
Serbian rebels
Serbian military leaders
People from Jagodina
1755 births
1788 deaths
18th-century Freikorps
Habsburg Serbs
People of the Military Frontier
Serbs from the Ottoman Empire